Lieutenant General Waheed Arshad, HI(M), TBt, afwc, fsc(t), psc, is a retired three-star general in the Pakistan Army who served as the Chief of General Staff (CGS) at the General Headquarters from 2010 to 2013. His previous appointments at the GHQ include; IG Training and Evaluation (IGT&E), Vice Chief of General Staff (VCGS) and DG Planning at COAS Secretariat. Waheed Arshad also served as the chief Army spokesman heading the Inter Services Public Relations from 2007 to 2008.

Army career
Waheed Arshad was commissioned in the Armoured Corps of the Pakistan Army in October 1975 in the 52nd PMA Long Course. He is a graduate of Command and Staff College Quetta; Turkish War College, Istanbul, and the National Defence College in Islamabad. He holds master's degrees in War and Strategic Studies from Quaid-i-Azam University, Islamabad and a diploma in the Turkish Language from National University of Modern Languages, Islamabad.

Command, staff and instructional appointments
During his career, he served as Brigade Major of an Independent Armored Brigade Group and remained on the faculty of Pakistan Military Academy Kakul, School of Infantry and Tactics, Quetta and National Defence College, Islamabad.

He commanded 16 Horse, an Armored Regiment and both an Armored and Infantry Brigades. He has also served as General Staff Officer Grade-1 and Director Military Operations at Military Operations Directorate.

Senior appointments
Waheed Arshad was promoted to Major General on 7 January 2005. He was then sent as GOC 26th Mechanized Division in Bahawalpur where he served until April 2007. He then proceeded to relieve Maj-Gen Shaukat Sultan as DG Inter Services Public Relations.

In January 2008, Waheed Arshad was appointed as the Director General, Planning at Chief Of Army Staff (COAS) Secretariat, heading the army's think-tank. This post was established by the former Army Chief General Jehangir Karamat. Maj-Gen Khalid Kidwai (who retired as Lt-Gen and chief of Strategic Planning Division) and Maj-Gen Ahsan Saleem Hyat (who retired as general in the capacity of VCOAS) held the appointments of DG Planning in the past. In October 2008, Waheed Arshad was appointed as the Vice Chief of General Staff (VCGS) of the Army replacing Lt. Gen. Muhammad Yousaf who took over the XXXI Corps at Bahawalpur.

Waheed Arshad was promoted to Lieutenant General in April 2010 and took over as IG Training and Evaluation (IGT&E). Barely six months later in October 2010, he took over as Chief of General Staff (CGS), the most coveted posting in Pakistan Army. He replaced the recently promoted General Khalid Shameem Wynne who was appointed as Chairman Joint Chiefs of Staff Committee. He was succeeded as CGS by Lt General Rashad Mahmood, who later became the Chairman Joint Chiefs of Staff Committee.

Personal life
Waheed Arshad is married and has three children.

Awards and decorations

References

|-
 

|-
 

Pakistani generals
Living people
Directors-General of the Inter-Services Public Relations
Year of birth missing (living people)
National Defence University, Pakistan alumni